Francis Little may refer to:

Francis Little (MP), member of parliament for Abingdon
Francis Little (American politician) (1822–1890), member of the Wisconsin State Assembly and the Wisconsin State Senate
Francis Little (tenor) (1939–2006)
Francis Little (sport shooter), English sport shooter

See also
Frances Little (1863–1941), American author
Frank Little (disambiguation)